Martha Christina Tiahahu (4 January 1800 – 2 January 1818) was a Moluccan freedom fighter and National Heroine of Indonesia.

Born to a military captain, Tiahahu was active in military matters from a young age. She joined the war led by Pattimura against the Dutch colonial government when she was 17, fighting in several battles. After being captured in October 1817, she was released on account of her age. She continued to fight, and was captured again. Sent to Java to be a slave labourer, she fell ill on the way and, refusing to eat or take medicine, died on a ship in the Banda Sea.

Tiahahu is considered a National Heroine of Indonesia. She has also been honoured with two statues, one in Ambon and one in Abubu; other namesakes include a warship, street, Moluccan social organization, and women's magazine.

Biography
Tiahahu was born in Santiago de Abúbu village on Nusalaut Island, in Maluku, on 4 January 1800. Her father was Captain Paulus Tiahahu of the Soa Uluputi clan. After her mother died while she was an infant, Tiahahu was raised by her father. As a child, she was stubborn and followed her father wherever he went, at times joining him in planning attacks.

Beginning in 1817. Tiahahu joined her father in a guerrilla war against the Dutch colonial government. They also backed Pattimura's army. She saw several battles. In a battle at Saparua Island, the troops killed Dutch commander Richement and wounded his replacement Commander Meyer. In another battle, she and her troops succeeded in burning Duurstede Fortress to the ground. During battles, she was said to throw stones at the Dutch troops if her soldiers were out of ammunition, while other accounts have her wielding a spear. After Vermeulen Kringer took over the Dutch military in Maluku, Tiahahu, her father, and Pattimura were captured in October 1817.

Carried on the HNLMS Evertsen to Nusalaut, Tiahahu was the only captured soldier not punished; this was due to her young age. After a period of time in holding in Fort Beverwijk, where her father was executed, in late 1817 Tiahahu was released. She continued to fight against the Dutch.

In a sweep in December 1817, Tiahahu and several other former rebels were caught. The captured guerrillas were placed on the Evertsen to be transported to Java; they were meant to be used as slave labour on the coffee plantations there. However, on the way, Tiahahu fell ill. Refusing medication and food, she died on 2 January 1818, while the ship was crossing the Banda Sea; she received a burial at sea later that day.

Legacy

Soon after Indonesia's independence, Tiahahu was declared a National Heroine of Indonesia; 2 January was designated Martha Christina Tiahahu Day. On that day, people in Maluku spread flower petals over the Banda Sea in an official ceremony honouring her struggle. However, the ceremony is smaller than that honouring Pattimura, on 15 May.

Several monuments have been dedicated to Tiahahu. In Abubu, a statue of her leading soldiers while holding a spear was erected and dedicated on the 190th anniversary of her death. She also has several items named after her, including a street in Karangpanjang, Ambon, and a warship, the KRI Martha Christina Tiahahu.

Other organizations have also taken Tiahahu's name as a symbol of bravery and "spirit of struggle", including a social organization for Moluccans in Jakarta and a women's magazine in Ambon.

References

Footnotes

Bibliography

 
 
 

1800 births
Moluccan people
1818 deaths
Indonesian Christians
People from Maluku (province)
Guerrillas
Women in war in Indonesia
Prisoners who died in Dutch detention
Burials at sea
Women in 19th-century warfare
National Heroes of Indonesia